Aleksandra Lisowska may refer to:
Aleksandra Lisowska (runner) (born 1990), Polish long-distance runner

See also
Hurrem Sultan